The HD Pentax DA 16-85mm F3.5-5.6 ED DC WR is an advanced standard zoom lens for K mount. It is made by Ricoh under the Pentax brand, and was announced on October 29, 2014.

External links

Official product page 

16-85
Camera lenses introduced in 2014